Sandra Gulland (born November 3, 1944) is an American-born Canadian novelist. She is the author of The Shadow Queen and Mistress of the Sun, novels set in the court of Louis XIV, The Sun King, and a trilogy of novels based on the life of Josephine Bonaparte: The Many Lives & Secret Sorrows of Josephine B.; Tales of Passion, Tales of Woe; The Last Great Dance on Earth.

To date, Gulland's novels have been published in fifteen countries and translated into thirteen languages. The Many Lives & Secret Sorrows of Josephine B. was a bestseller in the UK.

Biography
Born November 3, 1944, in Miami, Florida, Sandra Gulland (née Zentner) was brought up in Berkeley, California. After graduating from Berkeley High School, she attended San Francisco State College, the University of California, Berkeley, and Roosevelt University in Chicago, graduating with a BA in English literature and a minor in mathematics.

She emigrated to Canada in 1969, teaching for a year in Nain, Labrador, before moving to Toronto to work as a book editor in book publishing. She was a founding member of the Editors' Association of Canada (then the Freelance Editors' Association of Canada).

In 1978, she and her family moved to rural Ontario, where she was volunteer principal of the Killaloe Alternative School and co-publisher of The Community News & Confuse. She became a Canadian citizen in 1980. She and her husband now live half the year near Killaloe, Ontario, and half in San Miguel de Allende, Mexico.

Bibliography
The Many Lives & Secret Sorrows of Josephine B. — 1995
Tales of Passion, Tales of Woe — 1998
The Last Great Dance on Earth — 2000
Mistress of the Sun — 2008
The Shadow Queen — 2014

External links
 Sandra Gulland's official website
 An interview about Mistress of the Sun

1944 births
Living people
Canadian women novelists
Canadian historical novelists
Writers from Berkeley, California
Berkeley High School (Berkeley, California) alumni
American emigrants to Canada
20th-century American novelists
21st-century American novelists
American historical novelists
American women novelists
20th-century Canadian novelists
21st-century Canadian novelists
20th-century Canadian women writers
21st-century Canadian women writers
Women historical novelists
20th-century American women writers
21st-century American women writers